D. variabilis  may refer to:
 Dalaca variabilis, a moth species found in Chile
 Dendrobates variabilis, a frog species endemic to Peru
 Dermacentor variabilis, the American dog tick, a tick species found in North America
 Diplolepis variabilis, a plant species in the genus Diplolepis
 Donax variabilis, a mollusc species found on the east coast of the United States from Virginia to the Caribbean